Schnass or Schnaas is a surname. Notable people with the surname include:

Andreas Schnaas (born 1968), German horror film actor and director
Karin Schnass (born 1980), Austrian mathematician and computer scientist
Jörg Schnass, actor in 1996 US-French film The Proprietor